World No. 1 Caroline Wozniacki won the title, beating Peng Shuai in the final 2–6, 6–3, 6–3. It was Wozniacki's 16th career title and 4th of the year.

Seeds
The top two seeds received a bye into the second round.

Qualifying

Draw

Finals

Top half

Bottom half

References
 Main Draw

Brussels Open - Singles
2011 Singles